Veeranjaneya is a 1968 Indian Telugu-language film directed by Kamalakara Kameswara Rao. It is a musical film released in 1968, starring Arja Janardhana Rao, Kanta Rao, Anjali Devi and S.V. Ranga Rao.

Plot
The story is based on the Ramayana, from the perspective of the Hindu god Anjaneya.

Cast

Soundtrack
 "Aho Rama Katha" (Lyricist: Malladhi; Singer: Ghantasala)
 "Manasaina Daananura" (Lyricist: Arudra)
 "Nava Ragame Saagenule" (Lyricist: Veturi Sundararamamurthy; Singers: M. Balamurali Krishna, P. B. Srinivas)
 "Neelala Ningilo" (Lyricist: Samudrala)
 "Rama Naamame Madhuram" (Lyricist: C. Narayana Reddy; Singers: Ghantasala Venkateswara Rao, P. B. Srinivas)
 "Rama Neenamamu" (Suguna Dharma) (Lyricist: C. Narayana Reddy; Singer: Ghantasala Venkateswara Rao)
 "Sri Rama Rama" (Lyricist: Malladi Ramakrishna Sastry; Singer: Ghantasala Venkateswara Rao)
 "Sri Rama Rama Rama" (Lyricist: Malladhi; Singer: Malathi
 "Vachchaava Jathagaada" (Lyricist: Samudrala)

External links
 Veeranjaneya film at IMDb.
 Listen to Veeranjaneya songs at Raaga.com

1968 films
1960s Telugu-language films
Hindu mythological films
Films based on the Ramayana
Indian musical films
Films directed by Kamalakara Kameswara Rao
1968 musical films